Pentti Talvitie (March 1, 1922 Helsinki - September 14, 2003 Helsinki) was a Finnish diplomat and ambassador, a Bachelor of Political Science. He was an ambassador from 1970 to 1975 in Brussels, Secretary of State for Foreign Affairs in 1975–1977, Ambassador in Bonn from 1977 to 1979, in Lisbon from 1979 to 1984 and in México  1984  and 1985 again in Brussels from where he retired.

References 

Ambassadors of Finland to West Germany
Ambassadors of Finland to Belgium
Ambassadors of Finland to Portugal
Ambassadors of Finland to Mexico
1922 births
2003 deaths
Diplomats from Helsinki
Permanent Representatives of Finland to the United Nations